John Doubleday (born 9 October 1947) is a British sculptor and painter. His work includes statues of political leaders such as Nelson Mandela and Golda Meir as well as cultural icons such as The Beatles, Sherlock Holmes and Laurel and Hardy.

Doubleday was born in 1947 in Langford, near Maldon, Essex and studied sculpture at Goldsmiths College. In 2014, he unveiled a statue of Herbert George Columbine which is the United Kingdom's only statue of a named army private.

See also
 Statue of Charlie Chaplin, London
 Statue of Sherlock Holmes, London

References

Sources

External links 

 Official website

20th-century British sculptors
Modern sculptors
21st-century British sculptors
1947 births
Alumni of Goldsmiths, University of London
English male sculptors
English male painters
Living people
People from Maldon, Essex